Catherine Norton (née Norris; January 24, 1941 – December 22, 2014) was an American librarian. She was the first Director of Information Systems at the Marine Biological Laboratory (MBL).

Career
She received her education at Regis College and Simmons College (Master's degree, Information Science, 1984). She began working at the MBL/Woods Hole Oceanographic Institution Library in 1980, and in 1991 was made head of information services. She supported both digital libraries and open access. By 1994, she was the director of the library and led a program that became the basis for the first "Encyclopedia of Life" project. The idea behind the project was to enable medical researchers to utilize technology and to collect biomedical data in an easily shareable format and Norton served as one of the collaborators.

The MBL designed tools for Web site delivery and worked with partners at Harvard, the Field Museum of Natural History and the Smithsonian Institution to organize the project. Norton also published information about the project for other libraries to understand both its scope and how to utilize the information.

Norton had been consultant to the National Library of Medicine, and president of the Boston Library Consortium. She was also a member of the Falmouth School Committee, and Falmouth representative to the Steamship Authority's Board of Governors. She and her husband Thomas J. Norton had four children, Margaret, Michael, Kerrie, and Thomas.

Other
In 2014 the Catherine N. Norton Fellowship at the Marine Biological Laboratory was established to cover "approved expenses" for a student or "early year fellow".

Norton was a Justice of the Peace for almost four decades, marrying many happy couples on the beaches and back porches of Cape Cod.

Death
Catherine N. Norton died in Falmouth, Massachusetts, aged 73, after a battle with cancer.

Selected works

References

External links
 Publications
 Catherine N. Norton Fellowship at the Marine Biological Laboratory

1941 births
2014 deaths
American librarians
American women librarians
Place of birth missing
Deaths from cancer in Massachusetts
American justices of the peace
People from Falmouth, Massachusetts
Regis College alumni
Simmons University alumni
20th-century American judges
20th-century American women
21st-century American women